Crystal Lawns is a census-designated place (CDP) in Will County, Illinois, United States. The population was 1,830 at the 2020 census.

Geography
Crystal Lawns is located near the northwest corner of the city of Joliet, just southeast of the Westfield Louis Joliet shopping mall. Its geographic coordinates are  (41.569580, -88.156203).A golf course used to be on the land of Crystal Lawns the old clubhouse still stands but is falling apart. There is also a elementary school called Crystal Lawns Elementary School off of Crystal Drive. It is part of Plainfield School District 202.

Demographics

As of the census of 2000, there were 2,933 people, 1,024 households, and 809 families residing in the CDP. The racial makeup of the CDP was 95.74% White, 0.65% African American, 0.31% Native American, 0.41% Asian, 1.88% from other races, and 1.02% from two or more races. Hispanic or Latino of any race were 5.93% of the population.

There were 1,024 households, out of which 39.1% had children under the age of 18 living with them, 64.8% were married couples living together, 9.5% had a female householder with no husband present, and 20.9% were non-families. 17.7% of all households were made up of individuals, and 6.7% had someone living alone who was 65 years of age or older. The average household size was 2.86 and the average family size was 3.25.

In the CDP, the population was spread out, with 28.1% under the age of 18, 7.7% from 18 to 24, 29.9% from 25 to 44, 23.8% from 45 to 64, and 10.5% who were 65 years of age or older. The median age was 37 years. For every 100 females, there were 103.3 males. For every 100 females age 18 and over, there were 97.9 males.

The median income for a household in the CDP was $53,750, and the median income for a family was $59,583. Males had a median income of $42,065 versus $30,032 for females. The per capita income for the CDP was $20,369. About 3.7% of families and 6.2% of the population were below the poverty line, including 8.0% of those under age 18 and none of those age 65 or over.

References

Census-designated places in Illinois
Census-designated places in Will County, Illinois